Karimama is a town, arrondissement and commune in the Alibori Department of northeastern Benin. The commune covers an area of 6102 square kilometers  and as of 2013 had a population of 66,675 people. The town lies on the border with Niger.

Geography
The commune of Karimana is located 778 kilometres from Cotonou and lies on the Niger River. Communally it is bounded to the north and east by Niger, south by Malanville and to the west by Banikoara.

Administrative divisions
Karimana is subdivided into 5 arrondissements;  Karimama, Birni-Lafia, Bogo-Bogo, Kompa and Monsey. They contain 16 villages and 2 urban districts.

Economy
Most of the population are engaged in agricultural activities followed by trade, transportation and handicrafts. The main crops grown are maize, cotton, sorghum, cowpeas, peanut, okra, cassava, onion, potatoes and rice.

Climate
Karimama has a semi-arid climate (BSh) with hot dry season and humid, slightly cooler wet season.

References

Arrondissements of Benin
Communes of Benin
Populated places in the Alibori Department
Communities on the Niger River